John M. Brown III is a retired lieutenant general of the United States Army. He served as Commander of United States Army Pacific, headquartered at Fort Shafter, Hawaii, from August 25, 2004 to February 1, 2008. He enlisted in the Army as an infantryman in 1969 and became an officer upon completion of Infantry Officer Candidate School in 1971 where he was commissioned a second lieutenant of Infantry.

Early life and education
Brown holds a Bachelor's Degree in Biology from West Georgia College and a Master's Degree in Industrial Management from the Georgia Institute of Technology.  He is a graduate of the Infantry Officer's Advance Course, Army Command and General Staff College, and the National War College.

He was born in Atlanta, Georgia, graduated from Avondale High School in 1965, and is the oldest of five. He has a wife and two daughters.

Career
His command experience includes Commander, Combat Support Company, 1st Battalion, 26th Infantry, 1st Infantry Division in Germany; Commander, Headquarters and Special Troops Battalion, XVIII Airborne Corps, Fort Bragg, North Carolina, and Operation Golden Pheasant, Honduras; Commander, 3rd Battalion, 5th Cavalry, 3rd Armored Division, in Germany and the Gulf War, Saudi Arabia; Commander, 1st Brigade, 24th Infantry Division, Fort Stewart, Georgia, and Operation Vigilant Warrior, Kuwait; and Commander, United States Army Alaska.

Additional assignments include Executive Officer, 1st Battalion, 38th Infantry Regiment, 2nd Infantry Division in the Republic of Korea; Professor of Military Science, Southern Arkansas University, Magnolia, Arkansas; Chief of Staff, 1st Armored Division, United States Army Europe and Seventh Army, Germany and Task Force Eagle, Operation Joint Endeavor, Bosnia; Military Assistant to the Deputy Secretary of Defense, Washington D.C.; Assistant Division Commander (Forward), 10th Mountain Division, Operation Joint Forge, Bosnia; Director of Integration, Office of the Deputy Chief of Staff for Operations and Plans, United States Army, Washington D.C.; Deputy Chief of Staff for Training, United States Army Training and Doctrine Command, Fort Monroe, Virginia; and Deputy Commanding General for Transformation, U.S. Army Training and Doctrine Command, Fort Lewis, Washington.

Awards and decorations

References

United States Army generals
Recipients of the Legion of Merit
Recipients of the Silver Star
Recipients of the Distinguished Service Medal (US Army)
University of West Georgia alumni
Georgia Tech alumni
United States Army personnel of the Gulf War
Southern Arkansas University faculty
Living people
United States Army Command and General Staff College alumni
National War College alumni
Recipients of the Defense Superior Service Medal
Year of birth missing (living people)